Qobad (also Romanized as Qobād; also known as Akbar Qobād, Kabāt, Koāi, and Qobād-e Shīān) is a village in Shiyan Rural District, in the Central District of Eslamabad-e Gharb County, Kermanshah Province, Iran. At the 2006 census, its population was 515, in 111 families.

References 

Populated places in Eslamabad-e Gharb County